Trinity Church Lansingburgh is a historic Episcopal church complex located at 585 Fourth Avenue in Troy, New York.  The complex consists of the Gothic Revival style stone church (1869) designed by architect Henry C. Dudley, a Greek Revival style brick rectory (c. 1844), brick parish hall (1930), cemetery (1807) with approximately 240 graves, and a wrought iron fence (1901).

It was listed on the National Register of Historic Places in 1995.

References

External links
church website

Episcopal church buildings in New York (state)
Churches on the National Register of Historic Places in New York (state)
Gothic Revival church buildings in New York (state)
Greek Revival houses in New York (state)
1807 establishments in New York (state)
Churches completed in 1869
Houses completed in 1844
Historic districts on the National Register of Historic Places in New York (state)
National Register of Historic Places in Troy, New York
Churches in Troy, New York